Luis Francis D'Albenas Reyes (born January 11, 1996)  is a Uruguayan professional footballer who plays as a centre forward for Sud América in the Uruguayan Primera División.

Club career
Vicente started his career playing with River Plate. He made his professional debut during the 2015/16 season.

References

1996 births
Living people
Uruguayan footballers
Uruguay youth international footballers
Uruguayan expatriate footballers
Uruguayan Primera División players
Club Atlético River Plate (Montevideo) players
Rampla Juniors players
Patriotas Boyacá footballers
Expatriate footballers in Colombia
Association football forwards